The National Museum of the History of Ukraine in the Second World War is a memorial complex commemorating the German-Soviet War located in the southern outskirts of the Pechersk district of Kyiv, the capital of Ukraine, on the picturesque hills on the right-bank of the Dnipro River.

The museum was moved twice before ending up in the current location where it was ceremonially opened on May 9 (Victory Day) in 1981 by the Soviet leader Leonid Brezhnev. On June 21, 1996, the museum was accorded its current status of the National Museum by the special decree signed by Leonid Kuchma, the then-President of Ukraine.

It is one of the largest museums in Ukraine (over 300 thousand exhibits) centered on the 62-meter tall Motherland statue, which has become one of the best-recognized landmarks of Kyiv. The museum has been attended by over 21 million visitors.

Memorial complex
The memorial complex covers the area of 10 hectares (approximately 24.7 acres) on the hill, overlooking the Dnieper River. It contains the giant bowl "The Flame of Glory", a site with World War II military equipment, and the "Alley of the Hero Cities". One of the museums also displays the armaments used by the Soviet army post World War II. The sculptures in the alley depict the courageous defence of the Soviet border from the 1941 German invasion, terrors of the Nazi occupation, partisan struggle, devoted work on the home front, and the 1943 Battle of the Dnieper.

The Motherland monument

The monumental sculpture of the "Motherland" ("Мати-Батьківщина"), built by Yevgeny Vuchetich stands 62 meters tall upon the museum building with the overall structure measuring 102 m and weighing 530 tons. The sword in the statue's right hand is 16 m long weighing 9 tons, with the left hand holding up a 13 m by 8 m shield with the emblem of the Soviet Union. The Memorial hall of the museum displays marble plaques with carved names of more than 11,600 soldiers and over 200 workers of the home-front honored during the war with the title of the Hero of the Soviet Union and the Hero of Socialist Labor. On the hill beneath the museum, the traditional flower shows are held.

Name change

Until July 2015 the official name of the museum was Museum of the Great Patriotic War. In April 2015, the parliament of Ukraine outlawed the term "Great Patriotic war" as well as Nazi and communist symbols, street names, and monuments. On 16 May 2015 Minister of Culture Vyacheslav Kyrylenko stated the museum will change its name. Two months later the museum officially changed its name.

Gallery

See also
Mamayev Kurgan

References

External links
  
 360 degree panorama virtual tour to Museum of the Great Patrotic War 
 'The Kyiv "Mother-Motherland" marks the 25th anniversary', May 8, 2006, Korrespondent.net 
 'The Kyiv "Mother-Motherland" marks the 23rd anniversary', May 8, 2004, podrobnosti.ua 
 Photo 1024x768 (1)
 In a Museum Show, Ukraine Tells the Story of a War Still in Progress – New York Times
 How the War Changed a Kyiv Museum’s View of Its Past – New York Times

1981 establishments in the Soviet Union
1981 establishments in Ukraine
Museums established in 1981
Museums in Kyiv
Soviet military memorials and cemeteries
Monuments and memorials built in the Soviet Union
World War II museums
History museums in Ukraine
History of Ukraine in the Second World War
Military and war museums in Ukraine
Pecherskyi District